Lloyd Archer Merriman (August 2, 1924 – January 20, 2004) was an American professional baseball player who played outfielder in the Major Leagues from  to  for the Cincinnati Reds, Chicago White Sox and Chicago Cubs. Born in Clovis, California, Merriman played college baseball and football at Stanford University. He served as a United States naval aviator during World War II and was recalled to active duty while in the United States Marine Corps reserves during the Korean War. He served in Korea from January to August 1953 at K-3 in Pohang with the 1st Marine Air Wing and flew 87 combat missions in a Grumman F9F Panther jet fighter.

Because of his wartime service, he was nearly 24 when he was signed by Cincinnati in 1948. He had one year of minor league experience, with the 1948 Columbia Reds of the Class A Sally League, and batted .298 before becoming a member of the Major League Reds in 1949. He was the Reds' regular center fielder that season, but he batted only .230 with limited home run power, and was a reserve outfielder for the 1950–1951 Reds before being called back into military service as a Marine pilot.

He returned to the Majors in 1954 and batted a career-high .268 in limited service before closing out his MLB career in 1955 playing for both Chicago clubs. In retirement, he operated an insurance business and raised and trained horses in his native California. He died at 79 in Fresno, California. Merriman is enshrined in the Stanford Athletic Hall of Fame. He was also inducted in the Clovis Unified School District Hall of Fame on November 4, 2017.

References

External links

1924 births
2004 deaths
American Korean War pilots
Baseball players from California
Chicago Cubs players
Chicago White Sox players
Cincinnati Redlegs players
Cincinnati Reds players
Columbia Reds players
Major League Baseball outfielders
Portland Beavers players
Sportspeople from Clovis, California
Stanford Cardinal baseball players
Stanford Cardinal football players
United States Marine Corps personnel of the Korean War
United States Marine Corps pilots of World War II
United States Marine Corps reservists
Military personnel from California